The Treasury and Finance Department is the finance department of the Basque Government.

External links 
  
  

Basque Government